The rivière à la Loutre is a water course flowing into Gulf of Saint Lawrence, flowing in the municipality of L'Île-d'Anticosti, in the regional county municipality (MRC) of Minganie Regional County Municipality, in the administrative region of Côte-Nord, in province of Quebec, in Canada.

Forest roads serve the valley of this river. Forestry is the main economic activity in this area; recreational tourism activities, second.

Geography 
The Rivière à la Loutre draws its source from Lac long located in the center-west of Anticosti Island. This source is located at:
  east of the town center of the village of Port-Menier;
  south of the north shore of Anticosti Island;
  northeast of the south shore of Anticosti Island.

  towards the south, constituting the western limit of the SÉPAQ Anticosti by forming a hook towards the west at the end of the segment, up to a bend in the river;
  to the south in the SÉPAQ Anticosti, to its mouth.

Toponymy 
The toponym "rivière à la Loutre" was made official on December 5, 1968, at the Place Names Bank of the Commission de toponymie du Québec.

See also 

 List of rivers of Quebec

References 

Rivers of Côte-Nord
Minganie Regional County Municipality